
These are the films of the American silent film actor, comedian, director, and screenwriter Roscoe Arbuckle. Films marked with a diamond (♦) were directed by and featured Arbuckle.  He used the name William Goodrich on the films he directed from 1924 onward.

Arbuckle's films share the common fate of silent movies. Of the hundreds of features and shorts in which he appeared between 1909 and 1933, only about half are known to have survived, and many exist only in fragmentary form. Further, there is no single source from which the remaining Arbuckle library can be accessed. Surviving prints, negatives, stills and other materials are scattered around the globe, held by various corporations, government institutions, museums and private collectors.

As an actor: Early years - 1913 - 1914 - 1915 - 1916 - 1917 - 1918 - 1919 - 1920 - 1921 - Later years

As a director only: 1910s - 1922 - 1924 - 1925 - 1926 - 1927 - 1930 - 1931 - 1932 - References

As an actor

Early years 
 Ben's Kid (1909)
 Mrs. Jones' Birthday (1909)
 Making It Pleasant for Him (1909)
 The Sanitarium (1910)
 A Voice from the Deep (1912)

1913 
 Help! Help! Hydrophobia!
 Safe in Jail
 Murphy's I.O.U.
 Alas! Poor Yorick!
 That Ragtime Band
 The Foreman of the Jury
 The Gangsters
 Passions, He Had Three
 The Waiters' Picnic
 Peeping Pete
 A Bandit
 For the Love of Mabel
 The Telltale Light
 A Noise from the Deep
 Love and Courage
 Professor Bean's Removal
 Almost a Rescue
 The Riot
 Mabel's New Hero
 Mabel's Dramatic Career
 The Gypsy Queen
 The Faithful Taxicab
 When Dreams Come True
 Mother's Boy
 Fatty's Day Off
 Two Old Tars
 A Quiet Little Wedding
 The Speed Kings
 Fatty at San Diego
 Wine
 Fatty Joins the Force
 The Woman Haters
 A Ride for a Bride
 Fatty's Flirtation
 His Sister's Kids
 Some Nerve
 He Would a Hunting Go

1914 
 A Misplaced Foot
 Caught in a Flue
 The Under-Sheriff
 A Flirt's Mistake
 In the Clutches of the Gang
 Rebecca's Wedding Day
 A Robust Romeo
 Twixt Love and Fire
 A Film Johnnie
 Tango Tangles
 His Favorite Pastime
 A Rural Demon
 Barnyard Flirtations ♦
 Chicken Chaser ♦
 A Bath House Beauty ♦
 Where Hazel Met the Villain ♦
 A Suspended Ordeal ♦
 The Water Dog ♦
 The Alarm ♦
 Our Country Cousin
 The Knockout
 Fatty and the Heiress ♦
 Fatty's Finish ♦
 Love and Bullets ♦
 A Rowboat Romance ♦
 The Sky Pirate ♦
 Bombs and Bangs
 Those Happy Days ♦
 That Minstrel Man ♦
 Those Country Kids ♦
 Fatty's Gift ♦
 The Masquerader
 His New Profession
 The Baggage Smasher
 A Brand New Hero ♦
 The Rounders
 Lover's Luck ♦
 Fatty's Debut ♦
 Killing Horace
 Fatty Again ♦
 Their Ups and Downs ♦
 Zip, the Dodger ♦
 Lovers' Post Office ♦
 An Incompetent Hero ♦
 Fatty's Jonah Day ♦
 Fatty's Wine Party ♦
 The Sea Nymphs ♦
 Among the Mourners
 Leading Lizzie Astray  ♦
 Shotguns That Kick ♦
 Fatty's Magic Pants ♦
 Fatty and Minnie He-Haw  ♦

1915 
 Mabel and Fatty's Married Life  ♦
 Rum and Wall Paper
 Mabel and Fatty's Wash Day  ♦
 Mabel, Fatty and the Law  ♦
 Mabel and Fatty's Simple Life  ♦
 Fatty and Mabel at the San Diego Exposition  ♦
 Fatty's New Role  ♦
 Hogan's Romance Upset
 Fatty's Reckless Fling  ♦
 Fatty's Chance Acquaintance ♦
 Fatty's Faithful Fido ♦
 That Little Band of Gold ♦
 Wished on Mabel
 When Love Took Wings ♦
 Mabel's Wilful Way
 Miss Fatty's Seaside Lovers ♦
 Fatty's Plucky Pup ♦
 The Little Teacher
 Fatty's Tintype Tangle ♦
 Fickle Fatty's Fall♦
 A Village Scandal ♦
 Fatty and the Broadway Stars ♦
 Mabel and Fatty Viewing the World's Fair at San Francisco ♦

1916 
 Fatty and Mabel Adrift ♦
 He Did and He Didn't ♦
 Bright Lights ♦
 His Wife's Mistakes ♦
 The Other Man
 The Waiters' Ball ♦
 A Creampuff Romance ♦

1917 
 The Butcher Boy ♦
 A Reckless Romeo ♦
 The Rough House ♦
 His Wedding Night ♦
 The Late Lamented  (unconfirmed)
 Oh Doctor! ♦
 Coney Island ♦
 A Country Hero ♦

1918 
 A Scrap of Paper ♦
 Out West ♦
 The Bell Boy ♦
 Moonshine ♦
 Good Night, Nurse! ♦
 The Cook ♦
 The Sheriff ♦

1919 
 Camping Out ♦
 The Pullman Porter ♦
 Love ♦
 The Bank Clerk ♦
 A Desert Hero ♦
 Back Stage ♦
 The Hayseed ♦

1920 
 The Garage ♦
 The Round-Up (Library of Congress) feature film
 Life of the Party (Library of Congress, Gosfilmofond) feature film

1921 
 Leap Year ♦ (*Library of Congress) feature film
 The Fast Freight (*lost) feature film
 Brewster's Millions (*lost) feature film
 The Dollar-a-Year Man (*lost) feature film
 Traveling Salesman (*George Eastman House) feature film
 Gasoline Gus (*Gosfilmofond) feature film
 Crazy to Marry (*Gosfilmofond) feature film

Later years 
 Character Studies (1923)
 Hollywood (1923) cameo as unemployed actor
 Go West (1925)
 Listen Lena (1927)
 The Back Page (1931) ♦
 Hey, Pop! (1932)
 In the Dough (1932)
 Buzzin' Around (1933)
 How've You Bean? (1933)
 Close Relations (1933)
 Tomalio (1933)

As a director only

1910s 

 The Moonshiners (1916)

1922 
 Special Delivery

1924 
 Stupid, But Brave

1925 
 The Iron Mule
 Curses! 
 The Tourist
 The Movies
 Cleaning Up
 The Fighting Dude

1926 
 My Stars
 Home Cured
 Fool's Luck
 His Private Life
 One Sunday Morning

1927 
 The Red Mill
 Peaceful Oscar
 Special Delivery

1930 
 Si Si Senor
 Won by a Neck
 Up a Tree

1931 
 Three Hollywood Girls
 Marriage Rows
 Pete and Repeat
 Ex-Plumber
 Crashing Hollywood
 Windy Riley Goes Hollywood
 The Lure of Hollywood
 That's My Line
 Honeymoon Trio
 Up Pops the Duke
 Beach Pajamas
 Take 'em and Shake 'em
 That's My Meat
 One Quiet Night
 Queenie of Hollywood
 Once a Hero
 The Tamale Vendor
 Idle Roomers
 Smart Work

1932 
 It's a Cinch
 Moonlight and Cactus
 Keep Laughing
 Anybody's Goat
 Bridge Wives
 Hollywood Luck
 Hollywood Lights
 Gigolettes
 Niagara Falls

References
 

Male actor filmographies
Director filmographies
American filmographies